Owen Lindsay Abrahams (25 July 1933 – 31 January 2006) was an Australian rules footballer who played for Fitzroy in the VFL.

Abrahams' football career did not start well after he was rejected by Fitzroy's thirds team, but he moved to the amateurs where he played with the Commonwealth Bank team, from which he was selected with the Fitzroy senior team.

He made a name for himself as a specialist half-forward and was named All-Australian in 1958, played for Victoria 9 times, and was captain of the Lions in 1962. Abrahams was later named as part of the Fitzroy team of the century.

Following his retirement Abrahams served as the Lions' treasurer. He died in January 2006 at the age of 72 following a serious illness.

External links

Fitzroy Football Club players
All-Australians (1953–1988)
2006 deaths
1933 births
Australian rules footballers from Victoria (Australia)